Judo was one of the sports at the quadrennial Goodwill Games competition. Judo competitions were held at three of the five Goodwill Games, with it featuring for a final time at the Games in 1994.

Editions

External links
Past games from the official website

 
Goodwill Games
Judo